Malek (in Arabic مالك) is a masculine Arabic given name. It also denotes king written (in Arabic ملك or Persian ملک). Notable people with the name include:

 Malek Ashraf (died 1357), a Chupanid ruler of northwestern Iran during the 14th century
 Malek Awab, Singaporean footballer 
 Malek Bennabi (1905-1973), Algerian writer and philosopher
 Malek Boutih (born 1964), French politician and activist
 Malek Chergui (born 1988), French footballer of Algerian descent
 Malek Jandali (born 1972), German-born Syrian-American pianist and composer
 Malek Jaziri (born 1984), Tunisian tennis player
 Malek Koussa (born 1971), Syrian footballer
 Malek Maktabi, also known as Malik Maktaby, Lebanese television presenter
 Malek Mouath (born 1981), Saudi Arabian footballer

See also
Malek (surname)

Arabic masculine given names